KLO-FM (103.1 MHz) is a commercial radio station licensed to Coalville, Utah, and serving the Salt Lake City metropolitan area.  It airs a classic alternative radio format, known as "103.1 The Wave," and it is owned by Capital Broadcasting. The station is the radio home for Weber State University sporting events.  The radio studios and offices are at the 257 Tower in Downtown Salt Lake City.

KLO-FM has an effective radiated power (ERP) of 89,000 watts.  (The maximum for most FM stations is 100,000 watts.)  The transmitter is atop Humpy Peak, about 21 miles (34 km) east of Coalville.  It also operates several booster stations on 103.1 MHz around Northern Utah.

History

Modern rock (1983-1992)
This station began in 1983, licensed to Ogden, Utah, and broadcasting on 95.5 FM.  KJQN's Modern Rock format was also simulcast on a 1,000-watt AM station on 1490 kHz, which would later become KOGN.

In the late 1980s, KJQN was purchased by Abacus Communications.  Abacus decided to make major changes in personnel in 1991.  Fired program director Mike Summers, engineered a deal to take over another station, then-top 40 KZOL of Provo, Utah. Re-dubbed "X96" in February 1992, KXRK raided much of KJQ's talent. For a time the stations competed, but as KJQ's ratings eroded and modern rock promoters split their business, management decided to switch formats.

Top 40 (1992-2001) 
In early October 1992 KJQN-FM flipped to Top 40 hits, adopting the letters KKBE.

Classic alternative (2002-2005) 
In 2001, Simmons purchased stations in Brigham City and Oakley, and acquired the historic call letters. The "classic modern rock" format adopted by Simmons was meant to evoke music played on the original KJQ and the early music video days of MTV. The morning show featured veterans of the original KJQ, "Chet and Brad," and the station adopted some of the original KJQ's promotions including the old "Bessie" milk truck. Management went through several program directors including Ian McCain (from KCPX), Dom Casual (from KENZ and veteran of the original KJQ), Lara Jones (a veteran of the original KJQ), interim PD Todd Noker (also PD at sister station KXRK), Music Director Jon Smith (also from KENZ).

Adult hits (2005-2012)
On January 21, 2005, at noon, the station flipped to the adult hits format known as Jack FM.  Since the nationally syndicated Jack-FM format doesn't use disc jockeys, the air staff was laid off without advance notice. Management stated the audience "wasn't growing as fast as we wanted."

Frank Bell and Randy Rose programmed KJQN after the station flipped to Jack FM.  It stayed with adult hits for more than seven years.

Talk (2012-2014)
On June 29, 2012, the station announced that KJQN would drop the "Jack FM" format on July 16, 2012.  It would begin simulcasting the talk radio format of KLO 1430 AM.  The FM station switched its call sign to KLO-FM. The change took place at Midnight on that date.  The last songs on Jack FM were "Wild Wild Life" by The Talking Heads and the first few seconds of "Janie's Got a Gun" by Aerosmith, which was abruptly cut off by the start of the simulcast.

Adult contemporary (2014-2016) 
On March 26, 2014, 103.1 changed its call letters to KSQN, sparking rumors of a format change in the following months. On June 5, 2014, KSQN dropped its talk simulcast with KLO.  It began playing adult contemporary music, branded as "Sunny 103."

Classic alternative (2016-present)
On September 30, 2016, Capitol Broadcasting announced that KSQN would flip to 80s hits as "103.1 The Wave" the following Monday, October 3.  Promoting itself as "The Next Wave of New Wave", the format featured alternative rock and new wave music from the 1980s. The change took place at midnight on that date.  The last song on Sunny was "Roar" by Katy Perry, and the first song on The Wave was "Wake Up (It's 1984)" by Oingo Boingo. The new format featured many former Salt Lake City personalities.

The KLO-FM call sign returned on November 3, 2020. The change followed Capital Broadcasting's sale of KLO 1430 AM to El Sembrador Ministries, a transaction that did not include the KLO call sign. This change also saw Weber State Wildcats football and basketball move from 1430 AM to 103.1 FM.  The AM station became KMES.

Boosters

See also
 List of Salt Lake City media

References

External links
103.1 The Wave official website

Classic Alternative KJQ Tribute site
The Classic Alternative Blog - Edited by a fan of both incarnations of KJQ, and featuring news on the artists who were frequently played on KJQ.

LO-FM
Mass media in Salt Lake City
Radio stations established in 2004
2004 establishments in Utah